Sergey Konstantinovich Lapochkin (born 3 October 1958 in Leningrad, Russian SFSR) is a retired Russian professional football referee.

His son, also named Sergey Lapochkin is a FIFA referee.

References

External links 
 
 

1958 births
Living people
Soviet football referees
Russian football referees
Lesgaft National State University of Physical Education, Sport and Health alumni